Akjagaýa is a depression in the northwest Karakum Desert. It is located to the south of Sarykamyska Valley.
It is about 50 km long and 6 km wide. The lowest point is 81 m below sea level, making it the lowest point in Turkmenistan.

References

Depressions of Turkmenistan